Clark is a borough in western Mercer County, Pennsylvania, United States, along the southern shore of the Shenango River Reservoir. The population was 576 at the 2020 census. It is part of the Youngstown–Warren metropolitan area.

History
Clark bore the name of Clarksville into the late 1950s.  The original community was moved to the present site following the construction of a Shenango River dam for flood control near Sharpsville.

Geography
Clark is located at  (41.282049, -80.409591).

Notable locations 
 NorthStar Marina

 Pete's Berry farm

 Clark House

Demographics

As of the census of 2000, there were 633 people, 227 households, and 194 families residing in the borough. The population density was 207.9 people per square mile (80.1/km2). There were 233 housing units at an average density of 76.5 per square mile (29.5/km2). The racial makeup of the borough was 99.53% White, 0.16% African American, 0.16% from other races, and 0.16% from two or more races. Hispanic or Latino of any race were 0.47% of the population.

There were 227 households, out of which 32.2% had children under the age of 18 living with them, 76.7% were married couples living together, 7.0% had a female householder with no husband present, and 14.1% were non-families. 11.9% of all households were made up of individuals, and 5.3% had someone living alone who was 65 years of age or older. The average household size was 2.79 and the average family size was 3.02.

In the borough the population was spread out, with 23.4% under the age of 18, 6.3% from 18 to 24, 28.0% from 25 to 44, 29.2% from 45 to 64, and 13.1% who were 65 years of age or older. The median age was 41 years. For every 100 females there were 92.4 males. For every 100 females age 18 and over, there were 93.2 males.

The median income for a household in the borough was $53,438, and the median income for a family was $56,944. Males had a median income of $40,729 versus $26,625 for females. The per capita income for the borough was $24,892. About 1.0% of families and 1.7% of the population were below the poverty line, including none of those under age 18 and 4.3% of those age 65 or over.

External links 
Official Clark Borough, Mercer County Website

References

Populated places established in 1829
Boroughs in Mercer County, Pennsylvania